The 46th Army Corps was an Army corps in the Imperial Russian Army.

Part of
7th Army: 1916
8th Army: 1916
3rd Army: 1916 - 1917
Russian Special Army: 1917

Reference 

Corps of the Russian Empire